Thomas Kelly (13 January 1902–1979) was an English footballer who played in the Football League for Barnsley and Wigan Borough.

References

1902 births
1979 deaths
English footballers
Association football forwards
English Football League players
Stalybridge Celtic F.C. players
Barnsley F.C. players
Rhyl F.C. players
Wigan Borough F.C. players